Ptychodactis aleutiensis is a species of sea anemone found off the Aleutian Islands, Alaska.

References

Ptychodactinidae
Animals described in 2010